2018 Thai League 4 Eastern Region is the 9th season of the League competition since its establishment in 2009. It is in the fourth tier of the Thai football league system.

Changes from Last Season

Team Changes

Promoted Clubs

Promoted from the 2017 Thailand Amateur League Eastern Region
 Isan Pattaya

Promoted to the 2018 Thai League 3 Upper Region
 Marines Eureka

Relegated Clubs

Relegated to the 2018 Thailand Amateur League Eastern Region
 Prachinburi United

Renamed Clubs
 Isan Pattaya was renamed to Isan D'beachaura Pattaya
 Chonburi B was renamed to Chonburi U-23

Expansion Clubs
 Pattaya Club-licensing football club didn't pass to play 2018 Thai League 4 Eastern Region. This team is banned 2 years and Relegated to 2020 Thailand Amateur League Eastern Region.

Reserving Clubs
 Pattaya United U-23 is Pattaya United Reserving this team which join Northeastern Region first time.
 Navy U-23 is Navy Reserving this team which join Northeastern Region first time.

Stadium and locations

League table

Results by match played

Results 1st and 2nd match for each team

Results 3rd match for each team
In the third leg, the winner on head-to-head result of the first and the second leg will be home team. If head-to-head result are tie, must to find the home team from head-to-head goals different. If all of head-to-head still tie, must to find the home team from penalty kickoff on the end of each second leg match (This penalty kickoff don't bring to calculate points on league table, it's only the process to find the home team on third leg).

Season statistics

Top scorers
As of 26 August 2018.

Hat-tricks

Attendance

Attendance by home match played

Source: Thai League 4
Note: Pattaya United U-23 don't play Nakhon Nayok vs Pattaya United U-23 game. PLT judge this game to Nakhon Nayok win 2 - 0.
 Some error of T4 official match report 20 May 2018 (Chonburi U-23 0–0 Chanthaburi).

See also
 2018 Thai League
 2018 Thai League 2
 2018 Thai League 3
 2018 Thai League 4
 2018 Thailand Amateur League
 2018 Thai FA Cup
 2018 Thai League Cup
 2018 Thailand Champions Cup

References

External links
Thai League 4
http://www.thailandsusu.com/webboard/index.php?topic=388919.0
https://web.archive.org/web/20180107103557/http://www.smmsport.com/news.php?category=74

4
Regional League Central-East Division seasons